Edward or Eddie Davies may refer to:

Authors
Edward Davies (Celtic) (1756–1831), Welsh writer and druidic poet
Edward J. Davies (born 1947), American historian
Edward Tegla Davies (1880–1967), Welsh writer

Sports people
Eddie Davies (boxer) (born 1937), Ghanaian Olympic boxer
Eddie Davies (footballer) (1923–1995), English footballer
Edward Davies (footballer), Welsh-born footballer who played for Halifax Town in the 1930s

Politicians
Edward Davies (MP) (died 1590), MP for Cardigan
Edward Davies (Pennsylvania politician) (1779–1853), United States Representative
Edward William Davies (1855–1904), mayor of Fremantle, Western Australia, 1901

Others
Edward Roderick Davies (1915–1992), American industrialist
E. Brian Davies (born 1944), British mathematician
Edward Davies (RAF officer) (1899–1974), RAF Commander
Edward Davies (architect) (1852–1927), South Australian architect
Edward Harold Davies, known as E. Harold Davies (1867–1947), professor of music
Edward Davies (minister) (1827–1905), American minister, author and publisher
Edwin Davies (1946–2018), British businessman and philanthropist

See also
Edward Davis (disambiguation)